The 2015–16 Phoenix Fuel Masters season was the first season of the franchise in the Philippine Basketball Association (PBA).

Key Dates
 January 28: The PBA Board of Governors unanimously approved the sale of Barako Bull to Phoenix Petroleum in a special meeting Wednesday at the league’s headquarters in Libis, Quezon City.

Roster
S

Commissioner's Cup

Transactions

Trades

Eliminations

Standings

Governors' Cup

Transactions

Trades

Eliminations

Standings

Recruited imports

References

Phoenix Super LPG Fuel Masters seasons
Phoenix